Money in the Streets (German: Das Geld auf der Strasse) is a 1922 Austrian-German silent drama film directed by Reinhold Schünzel and starring Liane Haid, Liesl Stillmark and Max Ralph-Ostermann.

The film's sets were designed by the art director Oscar Friedrich Werndorff. It was shot at the Schönbrunn Studios in Vienna.

Cast
 Liane Haid
 Liesl Stillmark
 Max Ralph-Ostermann
 Alfred Neugebauer
 Robert Valberg
 Max Devrient
Jaro Fürth
 Julius Strebinger
 Josef Moser
 Heinrich Eisenbach
 Eugen Klöpfer
 Reinhold Schünzel
 Hugo Werner-Kahle

References

Bibliography
 Grange, William. Cultural Chronicle of the Weimar Republic. Scarecrow Press, 2008.

External links

1922 films
Films of the Weimar Republic
Films directed by Reinhold Schünzel
German silent feature films
German black-and-white films
Austrian drama films
1922 drama films
German drama films
Films shot at Schönbrunn Studios
Austrian silent films
Austrian black-and-white films
Silent drama films
1920s German films